Taufiq is a given name. Notable people with the name include:

Taufiq Ahmed (East Pakistan cricketer)
Taufiq Ahmed (Pakistan Air Force cricketer)
Taufiq Ghani (born 1989), Singaporean football player
Taufiq Ismail (born 1935), Indonesian poet, activist, editor of the monthly literary magazine Horison
Taufiq Kasrun (born 1985), Indonesian professional footballer
Taufiq Kiemas (1942–2013), Indonesian politician, Speaker of the People's Consultative Assembly of Indonesia
Taufiq Muqminin, Singaporean footballer
Taufiq Qureshi (born 1962), Indian classical musician
Taufiq Rafat (1927–1998), Pakistani author and poet
Taufiq Rahmat (born 1987), Singaporean retired footballer
Taufiq Tirmizi (1960–2020), Pakistani cricketer
Taufiq Wahby (1891–1984), Kurdish writer, linguist and politician
S.M.Taufiq, Mayor of Karachi in 1958
Muhammad Taufiq (born 1986), Indonesian professional footballer
Pervez Taufiq (born 1974), vocalist and songwriter for the hard rock band Living syndication
Rejwan Ahammad Taufiq, Bangladesh Awami League politician, member of parliament

See also
12179 Taufiq, minor planet, discovered 1977, 5.3 km diameter